Anthony T. Jordan (born May 8, 1965) is a former American football running back who played two seasons with the Phoenix Cardinals of the National Football League. He was drafted by the Phoenix Cardinals in the fifth round of the 1988 NFL Draft. He played college football at Kansas State University and attended East High School in Rochester, New York. He was also a member of the Houston Oilers.

References

External links
College stats
Tony Jordan profile

Living people
1965 births
Players of American football from New York (state)
American football running backs
African-American players of American football
Kansas State Wildcats football players
Phoenix Cardinals players
Houston Oilers players
Sportspeople from Rochester, New York
21st-century African-American people
20th-century African-American sportspeople